Johannes Vorst (1623 – August 4, 1676) was a Protestant theologian of Germany.

Vorst was born in Wieselburg in 1623. He studied, at Wittenberg, and was appointed in 1653 rector at Flensburg. In 1655 the Rostock University made him a licentiate of theology, and shortly afterwards he was called to Berlin as rector of the Joachimsthal Gymnasium. In 1660 he resigned his position, and became librarian to the elector of Brandenburg. He died on August 4, 1676.

Vorst wrote, Dissertatio de Lingua Omnium Prima (Flensburg, 1675): — Syntagma Miscellaneorum Acadeicorium (Rostock, 1652): — De Hebraisis Novi Testantenti Comment. (Leyden, 1665): — De Notabili Correctionum Masor eticarum: Genere (ibid. 1678): — Diatrib te de Adagis X, T. (Berlin, 1669), etc. — See Möller, Cimbriat Litteorata; Winer, Handb. der theol. Lit. 1, 30, 125, 129, 912; Jocher, Allgemeines Gelehrten-Lex. s.v.; Furst, Bibl. Jud. 3, 487; Steinschneider, Bibl. Handb. s.v. (B. P.)

1623 births
1676 deaths
German theologians
German librarians